Bačevci may refer to:

 Bačevci (Bajina Bašta), village in the municipality of Bajina Bašta, Serbia
 Bačevci (Valjevo), village in the municipality of Valjevo, Serbia